Carrick Heaths is a Site of Special Scientific Interest (SSSI), noted for its biological characteristics, in mid Cornwall, England, UK. It incorporates the old Silverwell Moor SSSI. Within the site the Red Data Book listed barn owl can be found.

Geography
These are located at the OS grid references:

References

Sites of Special Scientific Interest in Cornwall
Sites of Special Scientific Interest notified in 1973